Shahnawaz Dahani (born 5 August 1998) is a Pakistani cricketer who made his international debut for the Pakistan national cricket team in November 2021. He made his Twenty20 debut on 23 February 2021 in the 2021, for Multan Sultans. Dahani is a right-arm fast-medium bowler, who bats right-handed in the last-order.

Personal life
Dahani was born in a village near Larkana, Sindh, Pakistan, Dahani's late father was against his desire to become a cricketer, preferring for him the career of a government official, and this is the reason why he completed his education, earning a BCom degree, before starting professional cricket career.

English female cricketer Sarah Taylor once said that she wanted to marry Dahani because she was impressed by his bowling.

Domestic and T20 franchise career
He made his first-class debut on 25 November 2019, for Sindh cricket team, in the 2019–20 Quaid-e-Azam Trophy Trophy. He made his Twenty20 debut on 23 February 2021, for Multan Sultans in the 2021 Pakistan Super League. In July 2022, he was signed by the Jaffna Kings for the third edition of the Lanka Premier League.

International career
In March 2021, Dahani was named in Pakistan Test squad for their series against Zimbabwe. In June 2021, he was named in Pakistan Test squad for their series against the West Indies. In September 2021, he was named in Pakistan One Day International (ODI) squad for their series against New Zealand. Later the same month, he was named as one of three travelling reserve players in Pakistan's squad for the 2021 ICC Men's T20 World Cup. In November 2021, he was named in Pakistan Twenty20 International (T20I) squad for their series against Bangladesh. He made his T20I debut on 22 November 2021, for Pakistan against Bangladesh national cricket team.

In December 2021, he was again named in Pakistan's ODI squad, this time for their series against the West Indies. In March 2022, he was named in Pakistan's ODI squad for their series against Australia, and in May 2022, he was named in the ODI squad for the series against the West Indies. He made his ODI debut on 12 June 2022, for Pakistan against the West Indies.

References

External links
 

1998 births
Living people
Pakistani cricketers
Pakistan One Day International cricketers
Pakistan Twenty20 International cricketers
Multan Sultans cricketers
Sindh cricketers
Sindhi people